This is a list of programs currently and previously aired on UNTV Channel 37.

Currently aired programs

News & Rescue
UNTV C-News (2016)
UNTV Hataw Balita Pilipinas (2020)
UNTV Ito Ang Balita (2004)
UNTV Ito Ang Balita Weekend Edition (2020)
UNTV News Worldwide (2020)
UNTV Newsbreak (2016)
UNTV Why News (2015)
Repaso: The UNTV Year-End Coverage (annually; 2010, ongoing)
Tulong Muna Bago Balita (annually; 2016, ongoing)

Current affairs/commentary/talk
Get It Straight with Daniel Razon (2010)

Morning show
Good Morning Kuya (2007)

Drama
Kristiano Drama (2022)

Entertainment
ASOP: A Song of Praise Music Festival International (2011)

Public service
Ang Inyong Kawal (2021)
Doctors on TV (2011)
Huntahang Ligal (2018)
Lifesaver (2019)
Manibela (2010)
Pulis @ Ur Serbis Aksyong Mabilis (2012)
Serbisyong Bayanihan (2020; formerly known as Serbisyong Kasangbahay)
The TSIP: Talakayan sa Isyung Pulis (2022)

Infotainment
The Dive Philippines (2017)

Educational
KNC Show (2004)
Trip Ko 'To! (2019)

Sports
UNTV Cup (2013)

Religious
Ang Dating Daan (2004)
Ang Dating Daan: Mandarin Edition (2008)
D'X-Man (new season; 2004–2017,  2017)
MCGI Cares (2022)
MCGI Global Prayer for Humanity (2020)
How Authentic The Bible Is
Itanong mo Kay Soriano (Ang Dating Daan: Worldwide Bible Exposition) (2004)
Truth in Focus (2004)
UNTV Community Prayer (2013)

Previously aired programs
911-UNTV (2015–2019)
A Day in the Life of (2015–2016)
Ads Unlimited (2004–2005)
Alarma (2008–2010)
Ano sa Palagay Mo? (2004–2005)
Arangkada Na! (2015)
Are They Contradictory? (2004-2006)
ASOP By Request (2015–2016)
ASOP Music Festival Grand Finals Night (October 2012; December 29, 2013; November 2014; November 2015)
Ating Alamin (2010–2013)
Ayon sa Bibliya (2004-2006)
Balls & Stick (2008–2009)
Bantay OFW (2008–2010)
Barangay Hoopsters (2008–2010)
Barangay Showbiz (2004–2005)
Bayanihan (2012–2015)
Believer TV (2005–2008)
Bible Exposition (2004-2005)
Bible Guide (2004–2006)
Biblically Speaking (2004-2005)
Bihasa: Bibliya Hamon Sa'yo (2007–2008)
Bitag Live (formerly known as Bahala si Tulfo, Bahala sina Ben at Erwin: Tulfo Brothers: 2004–2013)
Bread N' Butter (2004–2005, 2008–2016)
Bread Tambayan (2007–2011)
Breakthrough (2004–2005)
Certified Kasangbahay (2007-2016)
Cook Eat Right (2011–2016)
Campus Challenge (2011–2013) 
Candidly Speaking with Willie (2010–2011)
Checkpoint (2008–2010)
Chika Mo, Chika Ko (2004–2008)
Climate Change: Ang mga Dapat Malaman ni Juan (2010)
Dating Buhay (2017)
Dito Po sa Amin (2004-2005, 2010)
Doc on TV (2007–2011)
Easy Lang Yan! (2010–2016)
Eat My Shorts (2001–2004)
Estranghero (2010–2011)
Ex - Files (2005–2006)
Face Off (2010)
FAQ's (2004–2005)
Fastbreak News (2010–2012)
Five Missions (2021)
Frontliners (2014–2016)
Get It Straight with Jay and Willie (2008–2010)
Go, NGO! (2008–2010)
Hataw Balita News Update (2007–2012)
Hataw Balita Newsbreak (2012–2016)
Hatol ng Bayan: UNTV Election Coverage (2007)
Healing Galing sa UNTV (2020–2023)
Hometown: Doon Po Sa Amin (2007–2008)
Huntahan (2012–2014)
In the Raw (2001–2004)
Istorya (2008–2022)
Justice on Air (2013–2016)
Kaagapay (2006–2016)
Kapitbahay at Kapitbisig (2004)
Kaka at Claire, Kaagapay Niyo (2006)
Kaka in Action (2005–2006)
Kakampi Mo Ang Batas (2004–2007)
Kami Naman! (2006–2008)
Katha (2007–2008)
Kids at Work (2004–2005)
Kayo ang Humatol! (2010–2011)
Kilalanin Natin (2010–2011)
Kilos Pronto (2016–2017, moved to PTV 4)
Klasrum (2011–2016)
Kulay Pinoy (2004–2005)
Law Profile (2010–2016)
Legally Yours with Atty G. (2016)
MCGI Cares: The Legacy Continues Charity Event Updates (2021–2022)
Maestra Viajes (2004–2008)
Make My Day with Larry Henares (2002–2020) (replaced by Ang Dating Daan for the time being due to COVID)
Manic Pop Thrill (2001–2004)
Mapalad Ang Bumabasa (2005–2016)
Mr. Fix It (2004–2005)
Munting Pangarap (2008–2018)
My OFW Story (2014)
New Generation (2005–2006)
Oras ng Himala (2003–2004)
Out of Time (2001–2004)
Pangarap ng Puso (2004–2005)
Pilipinas, Gising Ka Na Ba? (2005–2007)
Playback (2003–2004)
PMS (2003–2004)
Police and Other Matters (2011–2014)
Pollwatch: UNTV Election Coverage (2010, 2013, 2016, 2019, 2022)
Polwatch: Political Watch (2009–2016)
Pondahan ni Kuya Daniel (2013–2020)
Public Hearing (2005–2007)
QUAT: Quick Action Team (2011–2015)
Rise N' Shine (2012–2015)
Roam (2001–2004)
Rotary in Action (2010–2020)
Serbisyo Publiko (2004–2014)
Showbiz Overload (2008–2009)
Sound Connections (2004–2007)
Spotlight (2008–2018)
Sports 37 (2007–2016)
Start Your Day The Christian Way (2005–2011)
Startist (2005)
Strangebrew (2001–2004)
Tapatan with Jay Sonza: Bayan ang Humatol (2004–2005)
Teleskuwela (2004–2005)
Thanksgiving Day (2005–2007)
Tinig ng Marino (2014–2016, moved to PTV 4)
UNTV Hataw Balita (2005–2017)
UNTV Music Videos (2001–2004)
UNTV News (2012–2016)
Usapang Kristiyano (2005–2008)
Weird Doctrines (2004–2005)
What's Up Doc? (2004–2007)
Wish 1075 TV (2016)
Wishclusive music videos (2016, airing intermittently)
Workshop on TV (2004–2005)

References

Members Church of God International
Progressive Broadcasting Corporation
UNTV